Jan Mościcki (born February 6, 1988 in Łódź, Poland) is a Polish former competitive ice dancer. With former partner Joanna Budner, he is a three-time (2007–2009) Polish national champion. Their partnership ended following the 2008-2009 season.

He teamed up with Anastasia Vykhodtseva in 2009. They are the 2010 Polish national champions.

Competitive highlights
(with Vykhodtseva)

(with Budner)

 N = Novice level; J = Junior level; WD = Withdrew
 JGP = Junior Grand Prix

External links
 

Polish male ice dancers
Sportspeople from Łódź
1988 births
Living people